Frederick Charles Hedges (October 4, 1903 – December 10, 1989) was a Canadian rower who competed in the 1928 Summer Olympics.

In 1928 he won the bronze medal as member of the Canadian boat in the eights competition.

He was born and died in Toronto.

External links
 profile

1903 births
1989 deaths
Rowers from Toronto
Canadian male rowers
Olympic bronze medalists for Canada
Olympic rowers of Canada
Rowers at the 1928 Summer Olympics
Olympic medalists in rowing
Medalists at the 1928 Summer Olympics
20th-century Canadian people